This is a timeline of science fiction as a literary tradition. While the date of the start of science fiction is debated, this list includes a range of Ancient, Medieval, and Renaissance-era precursors and proto-science fiction as well, as long as these examples include typical science fiction themes and topoi such as
travel to outer space and encounter with alien life-forms.

2nd century

10th century

13th century

15th century

17th century

18th century

19th century

1900s

1910s

1920s

1930s

1940s

1950s

1960s

1970s

1980s

1990s

2000s

2010s

2020s

See also
 History of science fiction
 List of films set in the future
 List of science fiction authors
 Lists of science fiction films
 List of science fiction television programs
 List of science fiction television films
 List of science fiction novels
 List of years in literature

References

Science fiction